The 2018 Liga 3 Bangka Belitung is a qualifying round for the national round of 2018 Liga 3. PS Bangka Selection, the winner of the 2017 Liga 3 Bangka Belitung are the defending champions. The competition will begin on July 17, 2018.

Group stage 
The 6 probable teams to compete are mentioned below.
This stage scheduled starts on July 16, 2018.

Group A

Group B

Final

References 

 

Bangka Belitung Islands
Liga Nusantara
3